"Whenever You Need Me" is a song by Danish pop duo Infernal. It was released on 4 August 2008 as the second single from the album Electric Cabaret. A 2-minute preview of the song was released on 1 August 2008 for members of their website and soon after was sent to radios across Denmark. The song peaked at #2 on the Danish Airplay Chart, and was certified gold based on digital download sales in Denmark.

Track listings
CD single
"Whenever You Need Me" (Original) — 3:56
"Whenever You Need Me" (Hampenberg Pop Remix) — 5:13
"Whenever You Need Me" (The Mac Project Club Mix) — 7:17
"Whenever You Need Me" (Flipside & Michael Parsberg Remix) — 7:41
"Whenever You Need Me" (Asle Club Mix) — 7:27
"Whenever You Need Me" (The Mac Project Club Dub) — 5:31

Digital download
"Whenever You Need Me" (Original Version) — 3:58
"Whenever You Need Me" (Hampenberg Pop Remix) — 5:15
"Whenever You Need Me" (The Mac Project Club Mix) — 7:19
"Whenever You Need Me" (Flipside & Michael Parsberg Remix) — 7:43
"Whenever You Need Me" (Asle Club Mix) — 7:29
"Whenever You Need Me" (The Mac Project Dub) — 5:32

Credits and personnel
Written by P. Lagermann / L. Rafn / A. Powers.
Performed by Infernal.
Arranged, produced, recorded and mixed by Infernal at Infernal Studio and at Powers Studio.
Additional vocal production and recording by Anders Øhrstrøm at Playground Studio.
Additional vocals: Lina Rafn, Anders Øhrstrøm.
Guitar: Jimmy Dee.
Additional drums: Thomas Holmen.
Additional keys: Adam Powers, Anders Øhrstrøm.
Orchestral programming: Anders Øhrstrøm.
Track 2: Remix & additional production by Morten Hampenberg.
Track 3 & 6: Remix, additional production & programming The Mac Project. Additional keyboards by Aaaron Emerson & Steve McGuinness.
Track 4: Remix & additional production by A. Odden/M. Parsberg.
Track 5: Remix & additional production by Asle Bjørn.
A&R by Michael Guldhammer.
Mastered by Jørgen Knub and Jan Eliasson at Audio Planet.
Management by Alex Futtrup, AHM.
Art direction & production: Loïc Maes.
Graphic design: www.timandjohn.net
Photographer: Pieter Henket.
Styling: Aurélien Storny & Alexandre Misericordia.

Music video

The music video was shot in New York City in June 2008, and was directed by Loic Maes, the same from their previous singles "Ten Miles", "I Won't Be Crying", "Downtown Boys", and the next third single, "Electric Light". It was released on 4 August 2008 to exclusive members of their official website.

Charts

References

2008 singles
Infernal (Danish band) songs
Songs written by Adam Powers
Songs written by Paw Lagermann
Songs written by Lina Rafn
2008 songs